Sung-mo, also spelled Seong-mo, Song-mo, is a Korean male given name.

People with this name include:
Cho Sung-mo (born 1985), retired South Korean swimmer
Jo Sung-mo (born 1977), South Korean singer
Sung-Mo Kang, South Korean electrical engineering scientist and professor
Shin Sung-mo (1891–1960), acting prime minister of South Korea in 1950

Fictional characters with this name include:
Lee Sung-mo, in 2010 South Korean television series Giant

See also
List of Korean given names

Korean masculine given names